Burgess v Rawnsley [1975] Ch 429 is an English land law case, concerning co-ownership of land, and the conditions for severance of a joint tenancy in a circumstances where there is not a domestic relationship, that is two or more owners living together, co-occupancy.

Facts
Mr Honick and Mrs Rawnsley were joint tenants, but Mr Honick occupied the property alone. They bought it thinking they would both live there. Mr Honick was thinking of marriage, but Mrs Rawnsley intended to live alone in the upstairs flat, as they found out after. Mrs Rawnsley did not move in and they agreed orally she would sell her share for £750. But then she changed her mind and wanted more. Later on, Mr Honick died. The house was sold and his administratrix, Mrs Burgess, wanted to establish severance to get half the sale proceeds which would be more than £750.

Judgment
Lord Denning MR held that there was a sufficient common intention for severance at £750. The subsequent repudiation made no difference. He remarked Walton J was wrong on s 36(2) in Nielson-Jones v Feddon, and that severance also occurred through a course of dealings.

Browne LJ noted that simply because LPA 1925 section 40 is not fulfilled (now LPMPA 1989 section 2) did not mean an oral agreement would not bind because that section merely made it unenforceable, not void, in absence of writing. This was based on mutual agreement, not a course of dealings, but expressed no final opinion. Pennycuick LJ said that a course of dealings is a distinct head, not a subheading of mutual agreement.

As the three judges found there was severance, at £750, this was the amount declared to be payable in law to the executrix of Rawnsley, less than the half of the sale proceeds she sought.

See also

English trusts law
English land law
English property law

References

1975 in England
1975 in case law
English trusts case law
English land case law
1975 in British law
Court of Appeal (England and Wales) cases
Lord Denning cases